Sabyasachi Panda is a Naxalite-Maoist leader from India. He was wanted by the state police of several states in India for his involvement in criminal activities. He came into international news in 2012, for his alleged engineering of the kidnapping of two Italians nationals. He is also alleged to have involved and wanted in more than 50 criminal cases, including the murder of Swami Laxamananda Saraswati and four of his aides in Kandhamal district in 2008 that had triggered communal violence in the region. He was expelled by the CPI(Maoist) and then he floated a new party called the Communist Party of India (Marxist–Leninist-Maoist). He was also wanted in the abduction case of two Italian tourists, who were released later in March 2012. On 18 July 2014 Odisha Police raided a Maoist hideout in Ganjam district on the basis of intelligence inputs and arrested Sabyasachi Panda from Berhampur. 45-year-old Sabyasachi Panda carried a cash reward of Rs 5 lakh on his head.

Panda was captured on 18 July 2014 by Indian security forces in Ganjam District, Odisha.

Early life and education
Panda is a son of a freedom fighter and three-time CPI(M) MLA from Ranpur, Ramesh Panda. He graduated in mathematics from Puri’s Samant Chandra Shekhar government college. He is married to Subhashree or Mili Panda from Nimapara.

Murder of Swami Laxmananda Saraswati and his followers

Panda has been implicated in the 2008 murder of Swami Lakshmanananda Saraswati and four of his followers in Kandhamal district. The eighty-four-year-old monk had dedicated his life to Ghar Vapsi and to the ancient Vedic and Aryan traditions of the Khond vanavasis and they revered him. The murder of Swami Lakshmananda Saraswati, combined with Christian Charity and upliftment efforts of the Panna Christian community, would trigger communal violence between the two groups. He was expelled by the CPI(Maoist) and then he floated a new party called the Communist Party of India (Marxist–Leninist-Maoist).

Other crimes
He was also wanted in the abduction case of two Italian tourists, who were released later in March 2012.

Capture
On 18 July 2014 Odisha Police raided a Maoist hideout in Ganjam district on the basis of intelligence inputs and captured Panda in Berhampur, where he been hiding. The arrest was successfully carried out by the Odisha Police. The forty-five-year-old carried a cash reward of Rs 5 lakh on his head.

References

Naxalite–Maoist insurgency
Indian communists
Year of birth missing (living people)
Living people
Crime in Odisha
Communist Party of India (Maoist) politicians